Sierra Nevada blue may mean:
Polyommatus golgus, a species of butterfly in the family Lycaenidae, endemic to Spain
Agriades podarce, also called the arrowhead arctic blue or gray blue, a butterfly in the family Lycaenidae, found in the USA

Animal common name disambiguation pages